This article details the complete oeuvre of Canadian composer Daniel Vahnke. Between  1990 and 1996, Vahnke released six full-length studio albums both independently pressed and through a record label. Five of them were released as Vampire Rodents albums and one was ostensibly a solo album titled Papa Woody, which released under the name Ether Bunny.

Vahnke formed Vampire Rodents with keyboardist Victor Wulf in 1989 to serve as an outlet for their sound collage experiments. In 1990, they debuted with War Music, which was issued independently by their own label V.R. Productions and showcased their irreverent approach to industrial rock. Their second record, Premonition, was released in 1992 and adopted a more experimental sound, with violinist/cellist Andrea Akastia helping the duo to expand their musical pallet. Based on the creative success of that album, Vampire Rodents were signed to Re-Constriction Records.

Lullaby Land, released in 1993, became the group's first critical success. Vampire Rodents became an outlet for Vahnke's solo work and he decided to take a more commercial electro-industrial approach with the beat-driven Clockseed, which incorporated dense string and horn arrangements and a plethora of guest vocalists. He released two albums through Fifth Colvmn Records in 1996: Gravity's Rim, which further experimented with the song format, and Papa Woody, Vahnke's personal tribute to big band and bebop music that had been in the works since 1993. After experiencing legal disputes with Fifth Colvmn, Vahnke retreated from the music scene and announced his retirement in 2009. In 2017 Vahnke released the sixth Vampire Rodents album Noises in the Wall and the second Ether Bunny album Attention Please on his Rodentia Productions Bandcamp. He continued to relaease projects into 2020, including: Music for Player Piano, Early Soundtrack Sketches, Vol. I, Early Soundtrack Sketches, Vol. II, Axon Tremolo, Gravity's Rim (Instrumental Version), Cut to the Chase and ElevatorMan.

Discography

As Daniel Vahnke

As Vampire Rodents

As Ether Bunny

With Axon Tremolo

As Elevator ManN

Compilation appearances

Soundtrack appearances

Credits

References

External links

Discographies of Canadian artists
Rock music discographies